Wiborg may refer to:
Anders Nilsen Wiborg (~1655-1718), the fourth commander of the Christiansfjell Fortress.
Erlend Wiborg (born 1984), Norwegian politician for the Progress Party
Frank Bestow Wiborg (1855-1930), created Ault & Wiborg Co., the ink manufacturer
Jan Fredrik Wiborg (1944–1994), Norwegian civil engineer
Mary Hoyt Wiborg (1888-1964), New York City socialite
Sara Sherman Wiborg (1883–1975), daughter of Frank Bestow Wiborg

Other uses
Wiborg, Kentucky
The former Finnish town, now the Russian Vyborg

See also
Viborg (disambiguation)